"Celebrate" is a duet by American singers Whitney Houston and Jordin Sparks. It was written and produced by R. Kelly for the soundtrack album Sparkle to the 2012 musical drama film of the same name. The film starred Houston and Sparks. RCA Records released "Celebrate" as the first official single from the soundtrack. It is the last song recorded by Houston before she died on February 11, 2012. It was officially released on June 5, 2012 for digital download on iTunes and Amazon. The song made its US radio premiere on On Air with Ryan Seacrest on May 21, 2012. For the week June 16, 2012, "Celebrate" debuted at number 34 on the US Adult R&B Airplay. During that same week, "Celebrate" also debuted at number 84 on the US Hot R&B/Hip-Hop Songs chart, and has since peaked at number 62. The accompanying music video for the song was filmed on May 30, 2012. The video was shot over two days by director Marcus Raboy. The music video made its world premiere on BET's 106 & Park on June 27, 2012.

Background
"Celebrate" was written and produced by R. Kelly and is the last song that Whitney Houston recorded; it is a duet between Houston and R&B/pop singer Jordin Sparks. It was released as the lead single from the soundtrack album Sparkle: Original Motion Picture Soundtrack on June 5, 2012. It was officially released on June 5, 2012 for digital download on iTunes and Amazon. The song made its US radio premiere on On Air with Ryan Seacrest on May 21, 2012. For the week June 16, 2012, "Celebrate" debuted at number 34 on the US Adult R&B Airplay chart, having amassed 45 spins for that week ending. During that same week, "Celebrate" also debuted at number 84 on the US Hot R&B/Hip-Hop Songs chart, and has since peaked at number 80. The music video for "Celebrate" was filmed on May 30, 2012. The video was shot over two days and a preview premiered on Entertainment Tonight on June 4, 2012. The music video made its world premiere on BET's 106 & Park on June 27, 2012.

Composition
"Celebrate" is a soul and R&B mid tempo song influenced by 1960s themed music. Jason Lipshutz of Billboard wrote that the song "is a relentlessly optimistic jam that seamlessly interweaves Sparks' American Idol-winning vocals with those of her idol". During the second verse, Houston sings: "Though we've been going through changes / Just trying to make it from day to day / Tonight, don't you worry about a thing / Just cast your cares away", before the chorus returns.

Critical reception
"Celebrate" received positive reviews from music critics. Jason Lipshutz of Billboard called the song "a relentlessly optimistic jam that seamlessly interweaves Jordin Sparks American Idol-winning vocals with those of her idol".

Chart performance
For the week June 16, 2012, "Celebrate" debuted at number 34 on the US Adult R&B Airplay chart, eventually reaching number 10 for the week of September 1, 2012. During that same week, "Celebrate" also debuted at number 84 on the US Hot R&B/Hip-Hop Songs chart, and has since peaked at number 39. The song has also since made its debut on the US Adult Contemporary Billboard chart at number 26. "Celebrate" is Houston's 40th top 40 R&B hit. The song also reached number 9 on the Gospel Digital Song Sales chart, becoming Houston's ninth top ten single off that chart and Sparks' first.

Music video

Background

The music video for "Celebrate" was filmed on May 30, 2012. The video was shot over two days in down town Los Angeles and is directed by Marcus Raboy. A preview of the video premiered on Entertainment Tonight on June 4, 2012. The music video made its world premiere on BET's 106 & Park on June 27, 2012. The music video treatment originally was set to include both Sparks and Houston, But with her unexpected passing in February 2012 before the video was shot the treatment had been changed. Sparks says "When we did the song, we planned on it being Whitney and me. But she's not here, so we wanted to make it a tribute to her. So it's fun, upbeat and exciting — there are clips from the movie and the main cast is in the video too. It's me, Tika Sumpter, Carmen Ejogo, Derek Luke, Omari Hardwick ... Goapele is in it and Mike Epps. We're all just having a good time [and the premise is] they all come over to my house singing along to Whitney's music. And we're missing her and celebrating her as well. It's actually pretty simple, but when you watch it and hear her voice along with it, it makes it so much more."

Synopsis
Sparks hosts a house party at her place with fellow cast members of Sparkle in attendance. Throughout the video, Footage from Sparkle, mainly focusing on Houston, is spliced in throughout the clip. Houston's scenes in the music video show the late singer in her acting prime as she smiles in many of the clips then cries in another. The final shot of the music video is an image of Houston from the film. “Celebrate” is dedicated to Houston's memory.

Reception
The video was met with positive reception. Rebecca Ford of TheHollywoodReporter.com calls it "a very positive and uplifting video". Sabrina Rojas Weiss from VH1 said "For a while now, we’ve been thinking of Sparkle as “the movie that makes us really sad about Whitney Houston.” We probably weren't alone". She concluded "which is why the release of the video “Celebrate” was a brilliant move". Tanner Stransky of Entertainment Weekly praised the video saying "It feels triumphant, in a way, that they carried on [The Video] without Houston". Byron Flitsch from MTV.com says "we're really loving is the storyline that weaves in a montage of movie scenes" he went on to say "it's the emotional, almost home-movie quality honoring Whitney's on-screen presence that gets us all kinds of sentimental".

Awards and nominations

Track listing
Digital download
"Celebrate" – 3:35

Credits and personnel
Credits adapted from Sparkle: Original Motion Picture Soundtrack liner notes.
 Recorded at The Chocolate Factory, Chicago, IL
 Mixed by Serban Ghenea at MixStar Studios, Virginia Beach, VA
 Lead vocals – Whitney Houston & Jordin Sparks
 Composition, Production, Arrangement, Co-mixing, Keyboards & Additional Vocals  – R. Kelly
 Vocal Production - Harvey Mason, Jr.
 Guitar - Donnie Lyle
 Bass - Bigg Makk
 Additional Keyboards - Bigg Makk, Rodney East
 Choir - Joan Collaso, Yvonne Gage, Pastor Chris Harris, Mike Harvey, Jeff Morrow, Lauren Pilot Morrow, Robin Robinson
 Recording & Programming - Ian Mereness, Abel Garibaldi
 Vocals Recorded by Andrew Hey at Mason Sound, North Hollywood, CA
 Assisted by Davad Boyd, Micheal Daley & Dabling Harward
 Engineering - John Hanes
 Assistant Engineer - Phil Seaford

Charts

Radio and release history

References

2012 singles
2012 songs
Whitney Houston songs
Jordin Sparks songs
Songs released posthumously
Songs written by R. Kelly
Song recordings produced by R. Kelly
Music videos directed by Marcus Raboy
RCA Records singles